The Association for Tourism Exchange Across the Taiwan Straits (ATETS) is a semi-official representative office of the People's Republic of China in Taiwan handling tourism-related affairs. Its counterpart body in Mainland China by the Republic of China is the Taiwan Strait Tourism Association.

The CSTEA office is located in Ruentex Tower at Daan District, Taipei.

Opening
The official opening ceremony of CSTEA in Taiwan was held at the Grand Hotel in Taipei on 7 May 2010. The ceremony was attended by people from both sides of the Taiwan Strait. Shao Qiwei, President of CSTEA, represented Mainland China and served as both of the main speaker and master of ceremonies during the banquet.

Kao Koong-lian, Vice Chairperson of Straits Exchange Foundation, and Janice Lai, Director-General of the Tourism Bureau of the ROC Ministry of Transportation and Communications and Chairperson of Taiwan Strait Tourism Association were also present during the ceremony.

Tasks
The main tasks of CSTEA are:

 Consulting in tourism-related affairs
 Facilitating communications
 Handling disputes
 Promoting cross-strait tourism

Transportation
The office is accessible within walking distance southeast from Daan Station of the Taipei Metro.

See also
 Taiwan Strait Tourism Association
 List of diplomatic missions in Taiwan
 Cross-Strait relations

References

External links
  

Organizations established in 2010
2010 establishments in Taiwan
Organizations based in Taipei
Tourism agencies
Tourism in China
Tourism in Taiwan
Cross-Strait relations